Pogson is a surname. Notable people with the surname include:

George Ambrose Pogson (1853–1914), British diplomat
Isis Pogson (1852–1945), English astronomer and meteorologist
Kathryn Pogson (born 1954), English actress
N. R. Pogson (1829–1891), English astronomer